An American Ship in Distress is an 1841 oil painting on canvas by Thomas Birch.

References

1841 paintings
Paintings in the collection of the Timken Museum of Art